Igor Nikolayevich Yushchenko (born 9 March 1969) is a Russian professional football coach and a former player. He is the manager of FC Zorkiy Krasnogorsk.

Coaching career
On 25 October 2021, he was appointed as caretaker manager by Russian Premier League club FC Khimki. His caretaking spell ended on 19 November 2021.

References

External links
 

1969 births
People from Khimki
Living people
Russian people of Ukrainian descent
Soviet footballers
Russian footballers
FC Dynamo Moscow reserves players
FC Lokomotiv Moscow players
FC Lokomotiv Nizhny Novgorod players
Russian Premier League players
FC Chernomorets Novorossiysk players
FC Khimki players
Russian football managers
FC Khimki managers
Russian Premier League managers
Association football midfielders
Sportspeople from Moscow Oblast